Stephen Cilladi (born March 15, 1987) is an American professional baseball player who serves as bullpen catcher for the Los Angeles Dodgers of Major League Baseball.

Early life
Cilladi was born in Phoenix, Arizona; his father, Dave, was the trainer for the Colorado Rockies. He attended Mountain View High School in Mesa, Arizona. Cilladi played college baseball at Kansas Wesleyan University.

Professional career

Minor leagues
Cilladi was drafted by the Los Angeles Dodgers in the 33rd round of the 2009 Major League Baseball Draft. He split his first year between the Arizona League Dodgers and Inland Empire 66ers, hitting .122 for the rookie team and .000 for the 66ers. Cilladi then spent the 2010 season entirely in the Arizona League, putting up a .292 average with a home run in his second campaign. In 2011, he was promoted to the Great Lakes Loons, where he hit .185. In 2012, he joined the Albuquerque Isotopes, getting only one at-bat and striking out; on the side, he caught bullpens. In 2013, he played again with the Isotopes, appearing in one game, catching all 18 innings of the longest game in the Isotopes' history.

Major leagues
In 2014, Cilladi joined the Los Angeles Dodgers' major-league coaching staff, serving as the bullpen catcher.

References

External links

Baseball players from Arizona
Living people
1987 births
Los Angeles Dodgers coaches
Minor league baseball players
Arizona League Dodgers players
Inland Empire 66ers of San Bernardino players
Great Lakes Loons players
Albuquerque Isotopes players
Baseball catchers
Kansas Wesleyan Coyotes baseball players